Michael Finnegan or Finnigan may refer to:

 Michael C. Finnegan (born 1955), former Chief of Staff for New York Governor George Pataki
 Michael Finnegan (Belizean politician), Minister of Housing from Belize
 Michael Finnegan (anthropologist), professor of anthropology at Kansas State University
 Mike Finnigan (1945–2021), American keyboard player
 "Michael Finnegan" (song), Irish folk song

Finnegan, Michael